Red Letter Media, LLC is an American film and video production company operated by independent filmmakers Mike Stoklasa (formerly of GMP Pictures) and Jay Bauman (formerly of Blanc Screen Cinema). It was formed by Stoklasa in 2004 while he was living in Scottsdale, Arizona, but is currently based in Milwaukee, Wisconsin. It attracted significant attention in 2009 through Stoklasa's 70-minute video review of the 1999 film Star Wars: Episode I – The Phantom Menace. The review was posted in seven parts on YouTube, and was presented by his character "Harry S. Plinkett" (often shortened to "Mr. Plinkett"). While Stoklasa had published other video reviews of several Star Trek films before that, his Phantom Menace and subsequent Star Wars prequel reviews were praised for both content and presentation.

Numerous other series have been produced by Red Letter Media, including several movie review-based web series (Half in the Bag, Best of the Worst, and re:View), satirical podcasts (The Nerd Crew) and video game-based web series (Game Station 2.0, Previously Recorded). Low budget features produced by and starring Stoklasa and other Red Letter Media members have been largely comedies like Oranges: Revenge of the Eggplant, or horror films such as Feeding Frenzy, The Recovered, and Space Cop. Alongside Stoklasa and Bauman, Red Letter Media also employs Rich Evans, Stoklasa's long-time friend and confidant, as a full-time actor, stagehand, and best boy for their projects. Stoklasa, Bauman, Evans, and their friends Jack Packard, Josh Davis, and Tim Higgins appear as cast members for the vast majority of their YouTube releases.

Web series

Mr. Plinkett's Reviews
Stoklasa created his first video review for Star Trek Generations after watching the film again in 2008. Stoklasa believed his own voice sounded "too boring" for the review and adopted the persona of Harry S. Plinkett, a character he had previously used in several short films (originally played by Rich Evans). The character first appeared in You're Invited! The Olsen Twins Movie, a short film that incorporates clips from The Adventures of Mary-Kate & Ashley, in which the Olsen twins accept a phone call from a man named Mr. Plinkus, a name Stoklasa and Evans either misheard as, or altered to, Mr. Plinkett.

Plinkett has been described as "cranky", a "schizophrenic", and "psychotic" with a voice that has been called "a cross between Dan Aykroyd in The Blues Brothers and The Silence of the Lambs''' Buffalo Bill".

The Star Trek Generations Plinkett review was met with many favorable comments, inspiring Stoklasa to review the other three Star Trek: The Next Generation films—First Contact (1996), Insurrection (1998), and Nemesis (2002). Inspired by these, Stoklasa created his review for Star Wars: Episode I – The Phantom Menace, citing his dislike of the franchise's prequel trilogy, and how it influenced a trend of films characterized by CGI spectacle, in lieu of the live-action stunts and meticulously crafted sets that characterized films of earlier decades.

Stoklasa's review of The Phantom Menace was published to YouTube on December 10, 2009, and quickly became popular, receiving over five million views in the first four months of its release. The video was widely shared, including by celebrities such as Damon Lindelof and Simon Pegg. In comparison to his earlier Star Trek movie reviews, which lasted 30 to 40 minutes, the Phantom Menace review had a total run time of approximately 70 minutes. The review took Stoklasa between seven and ten days to complete. As of July 2021, the first episode of the review is the most watched video on Red Letter Media's YouTube channel, with more than 10 million views.

Subsequent Plinkett reviews have covered the James Cameron films Avatar and Titanic, Star Wars: Episode II – Attack of the Clones, Star Wars: Episode III – Revenge of the Sith, Baby's Day Out (which was referenced at the end of the Attack of the Clones review), the children's movie Cop Dog (originally mentioned in a short update video), Indiana Jones and the Kingdom of the Crystal Skull, Star Wars: The Force Awakens as well as its sequel The Last Jedi, and the 2016 Ghostbusters reboot. Stoklasa also created a satirical short film review of J. J. Abrams' Star Trek and later followed it up with a full-length review. 

Stoklasa has released audio commentary tracks done in the Plinkett character for Star Wars, Star Wars: Episode I – The Phantom Menace and Star Trek V: The Final Frontier, which are available for download. 

In an interview, Stoklasa stated that in creating a review, he and a friend would watch the film only once while taking notes and frequently pausing the film to discuss scenes. After that, he would write a 20–30 page script for it in the Plinkett character, voice it, and edit it together along with some improvisations.

Half in the BagHalf in the Bag is a regularly released series in which Stoklasa and Bauman review films in a more traditional format, albeit with a haphazard and fourth wall breaking overarching plot. Stoklasa has described it as a cross between Siskel and Ebert and a 1980s sitcom, with Stoklasa and Bauman playing VCR repairmen who discuss movies while finding increasingly convoluted ways of avoiding their scheduled repair work on Mr. Plinkett's VCR. 

The show often features the character of Plinkett portrayed by Rich Evans. Tim Heidecker, who hosts satiric movie review show On Cinema, makes a cameo in episode 37 as the owner of the VCR repair shop who bequeaths employment to Jay and Mike.

The first episode premiered on March 12, 2011, with a review of Drive Angry and The Adjustment Bureau. On March 11, 2021, the channel posted a scripted video celebrating the 10th anniversary of the series. As of December 2022, the series totals 248 episodes on YouTube. The most viewed episodes of the series are reviews of the Star Wars films The Last Jedi and The Rise of Skywalker.

Best of the WorstBest of the Worst is a regularly-released series in which members of Red Letter Media watch and review multiple films ranging from B-movies to instructional videos, sometimes sent in by fans. After viewing and riffing on the films, a rotating panel of four sit to discuss what they just watched. Panels typically consist of any combination of Mike Stoklasa, Jay Bauman, Rich Evans, Jessi Nakles, Jack Packard, Josh "The Wizard" Davis, or special guests. Panel participants then individually decide upon which film or video represents the "Best of the Worst". Viewing material that is deemed to be insulting, offensive, or especially poor is often destroyed in a creative fashion. Methods of destruction have included dissolving a VHS tape in acetone, forcing a DVD through a paper shredder, dragging a tape around the streets tied to the bumper of a car, and cooking a tape on a charcoal grill alongside cheeseburgers.

Canadian visual effects artists Colin Cunningham and Jim Maxwell, who have worked on numerous television series and feature films, frequently appear as recurring guests. Special guests on the show have included screenwriters Max Landis and Simon Barrett, comic book artist Freddie Williams, actors Macaulay Culkin, Patton Oswalt and Jack Quaid, comedian Gillian Bellinger and indie film auteur Len Kabasinski.

Some episodes feature the "Wheel of the Worst", in which a wheel is spun to select which films/videos will be watched. Wheel selections are often videos that are either extremely bizarre (such as "Dog Sitter", a movie made to appeal to dogs), low budget instructional films, educational films and those which have little modern relevance (such as Chinese-language instructional tapes about how to use AOL). Videos featured on Wheel of the Worst are most frequently found on VHS tapes. The Daily Herald praised Best of the Worst for being Red Letter Media's most entertaining series.

The show occasionally features other gimmicks to randomly select viewing material such as the "Choose-And-Lose" and the Plinketto Board. Another subsection of Best of the Worst includes the "Black Spine Edition" where the group randomly selects VHS tapes which are missing informational or identification labels on the side of the cassette.

Sometimes the crew will review a specific film which they have previously viewed off camera and recommend to fans of poorly-conceived and poorly-executed B movies. They refer to reviews of this nature as their "Spotlight Series". The first of these reviews featured the film Hollywood Cop by director Amir Shervan was released on YouTube on June 21, 2017. In this format, low budget indie movies Suburban Sasquatch, Lycan Colony and The Last Vampire on Earth have also been featured.

In 2017, the crew introduced a 'Hall of Fame' for Best of the Worst, intended to represent the best things that have appeared on the show. The first additions to the hall of fame were a framed portrait of actor Cameron Mitchell and the film Surviving Edged Weapons. As of July 2022, the Hall of Fame has also been shown to include the films Creating Rem Lezar and Zaat, as well as a vinyl LP of Meredith Monk's Turtle Dreams and a bobblehead statue of Kevin from the Home Alone series signed by frequent guest Macaulay Culkin.

re:View
On May 24, 2016, the company released the first episode of a new series called re:View. Compared to the company's other shows, the format is a much more stripped down and straight forward approach to film critique. Two members of Red Letter Media sit in front of a red curtain and offer thoughts and insight on a film that they both enjoy. Films chosen for this feature are often either cult classics such as Pink Flamingos, Freddy Got Fingered and Martin, or well renowned genre-defining films like The Thing and Ghostbusters. Clips of the film being discussed are interwoven, typically to lend emphasis to a specific point being made, or to showcase some of the most memorable moments from the film. re:View has also featured Star Trek films and episodes, a particular favorite of Stoklasa's.

For an episode featuring The Guest, the screenwriter of the film, Simon Barrett, appeared as a guest and spoke about many behind the scenes aspects of the production. A similar insight into the background of a film the Red Letter Media crew enjoyed was shared in a two-part interview series with Samurai Cop lead Matt Hannon, though this occurred prior to the creation of the re:View branding and format. Former child star Macaulay Culkin made a guest appearance in a 2018 episode reviewing Hackers, and has since returned to both this series and Best of the Worst.

Previously Recorded
In July 2014, Red Letter Media affiliates Rich Evans and Jack Packard began a YouTube Video game review channel under the name Previously Recorded or Pre-Rec. Videos from the channel have been featured on the Red Letter Media website alongside other Red Letter Media content, and the channel has been referenced in numerous Half in the Bag and Best of the Worst episodes. The channel was Red Letter Media's second attempt at producing gaming content after the short-lived Game Station 2.0 (2012). On July 22, 2018, the duo announced that they would be broadcasting their final live stream on July 25, 2018 and then the channel would be put on hold for the foreseeable future afterwards.

The Nerd Crew: A Pop Culture Podcast
The first episode being uploaded to YouTube on 5 January 2017, The Nerd Crew parodied pop culture "fanboyism" and video series such as Screen Junkies, Collider, and The John Campea Show, with Stoklasa, Bauman and Evans playing "manchildren" demonstrating excessive enthusiasm over Star Wars, the Marvel Cinematic Universe, the DC Extended Universe, and other content aimed primarily at a juvenile audience. Product placement, native advertising and general subservience to entertainment mega-corporations were all satirized.

Films
Red Letter Media also produces original feature-length films. Among the low-budget features Stoklasa and Bauman have produced and directed on Red Letter Media are the action-comedy film Oranges: Revenge of the Eggplant, made in 2005 and available on Netflix (currently only available for DVD rental, not for streaming); The Recovered, a horror thriller starring Tina Krause; and Feeding Frenzy, a 2010 genre-spoof of puppet monster movies like Gremlins. Feeding Frenzy featured Rich Evans as Mr. Plinkett; Evans originated the character in short films, and this feature was filmed before the popularity of the Phantom Menace review. Stoklasa's short films are usually dark comedies. Plinkett, played by Evans, appeared in several of them, starting with "You're Invited".

Stoklasa created and starred in five seasons of the web sitcom The Grabowskis, opposite Dixie Jacobs, about an exaggeratedly trashy and unpleasant sitcom family. Installments of the series were only a few seconds long at first (comically giving more screen time to the lengthy intro than the episode itself), but grew to full episode length over time.

On October 26, 2015, the company announced via a short video that it had completed the feature-length film Space Cop, which had been in production for at least seven years. Space Cop stars Evans in the titular role alongside Stoklasa, who wrote and co-directed the film with Bauman. It was made available on January 12, 2016, on Blu-ray for $25 through Red Letter Media's Bandcamp page. The first run sold out in a matter of hours.

Commentary tracks
Since 2012, Red Letter Media has produced commentary tracks for various films, releasing them on Bandcamp. These began with three commentary tracks by Stoklasa as Mr. Plinkett, but the company has since released tracks by Stoklasa, Bauman, and Evans as themselves.

Nukie VHS auction
The company collected Nukie VHS tapes for nearly a decade after fans began mailing them copies of the film. However, they never watched the film until December 2022, when they released a special episode about the practice of grading VHS tapes following reports that a VHS copy of Back to the Future sold for $75,000. They had one Nukie tape professionally graded, while the others (over 100 tapes) were destroyed using a woodchipper to inflate the graded tape's value. The graded tape was then put up for auction on eBay, ultimately selling for $80,600. This set a record for the most expensive selling VHS tape in history. Proceeds from the auction were donated to the Wisconsin Humane Society and St. Jude Children's Research Hospital, with the donation to the Wisconsin Humane Society being the largest donation in the organization's history. The ethics regarding the destruction of the other tapes to raise the price of the auction inspired debate on social media.

Reception
Stoklasa's Mr. Plinkett reviews have been considered part of an emerging art form that hybridizes mashup with video essays, as they use a combination of footage from the movie in question and other related sources.

Literary and cultural critic Benjamin Kirbach argues that Plinkett enacts a kind of détournement by recontextualizing images that would otherwise serve as Star Wars marketing material (such as behind-the-scenes footage and interviews). Defined by Guy Debord as "the reuse of preexisting artistic elements in a new ensemble", détournement is a way of generating meaning out of cultural texts that is antithetical to their original intent. Kirbach argues that Stoklasa uses this tactic to construct a subversive narrative that frames George Lucas as "a lazy, out-of-touch, and thoroughly unchallenged filmmaker".

Kirbach also argues that Plinkett's popularity can be explained, in part, as a form of catharsis. Because he is portrayed as insane, the Plinkett shtick "legitimates our nerd-rage by literalizing it". Plinkett enrolls George Lucas in an ongoing Oedipal drama as the castrating father figure, a father figure we are invited to rage against owing to his flagrant ineptitude. But aside from raw catharsis, Kirbach claims that Plinkett's insanity is also a critique of the film industry itself. By fictionalizing his critic, Stoklasa constructs a character who is unable to speak at a safe distance from the text he analyzes. "Plinkett becomes the figure of a consumer culture that has been force-fed Hollywood schlock beyond its carrying capacity," Kirbach writes. And further:

In an interview with Esquire, comedian Patton Oswalt noted that the Mr. Plinkett reviews are an example of "amazing film scholarship" on the Star Wars prequels that demonstrate how much of the Star Wars universe is squandered by them. The Daily Telegraph called the reviews "legendary" and described them as being more popular than the actual films.

Director Jordan Vogt-Roberts, whilst critiquing CinemaSins' Everything Wrong With ... video of his film, Kong: Skull Island, for bad film criticism masked under the guise of "satire", praised Red Letter Media for good film criticism and satire, stating that "Red Letter Media's Phantom Menace review IS satire. They lampoon a certain type of nerd culture AND their takedown is accurate & thoughtful. Red Letter Media's critiques hold up under scrutiny. CinemaSins just wants to shit on things for the sake of shitting on them."

However, the reviews have also been criticized by Star Wars fans. Stoklasa stated that he feels "Star Wars to some people is like a religion so they respond to attacks on it as such." One fan wrote a 108-page-long point-by-point response to the Phantom Menace review, taking issue with many of Stoklasa's criticisms, which Stoklasa mocked in an announcement video for his Revenge of the Sith review.

Filmography
Mr. Plinkett reviews

 Star Trek Generations (2008)
 Star Trek: First Contact (2009)
 Star Trek: Insurrection (2009)
 Star Trek: Nemesis (2009)
 Star Wars: Episode I – The Phantom Menace (2009)
 Avatar (2010)
 Star Wars: Episode II – Attack of the Clones (2010)
 Baby's Day Out (2010)
 Star Trek (2010)
 Star Wars: Episode III – Revenge of the Sith (2010)
 Cop Dog (2011)
 Indiana Jones and the Kingdom of the Crystal Skull (2011)
 Titanic (2012)
 "The Star Wars Awakens" / Star Wars: The Force Awakens (2016)
 Ghostbusters (2016)
 "Star Wars: The Last Plinkett Review" / Star Wars: The Last Jedi (2018)
 Star Trek: Picard, season 1 (2020)
 Halloween Ends (2022; excerpt from Half In the Bag)

Feature films

 Gorilla Interrupted (2003)
 Oranges: Revenge of the Eggplant (2004)
 The Recovered (2008)
 Feeding Frenzy (2010)
 How Not to Make a Movie (2013)
 Doc of the Dead (2014) (segments)
 Space Cop (2016)

Short films

 Richard Edlund VS His Sons (mid 1990s)
 GMP Uncensored (circa 1990s)
 Monkey Man Gets His (1999)
 You're Invited! The Olsen Twins Movie (unknown)
 The Cleaning Lady (2001)
 Where's Deathlist? (2001)
 The Long Walk Home (2001)
 The Care Boars Save Christmas (2003)
 The United States of Noooo!!! (2005)
 Dale Jackson Reporting (2005)
 Mr. Plinkett's Bee Bustin' Service (2006)
 Das Foot (2008)
 I'm Gonna Make Wine Out of Your Testicles (2009)
 Recipe for Disaster! (2009)
 The Western Ore Musical! (2009)
 Revenge of Nadine: The Episode III Review Epilogue (2011)
 The Great Space Jam (2011)
 When Red Letter Media Met Tommy (2012)
 Mike and Jay Eat Fried Chicken (2012)
 Fake Plinkett Orders His Prescriptions (2012)
 Fuck Bot Denounces Daniel Tosh (2012)
 George Lucas Kills Star Wars (2012)
 DENNY'S HOBBIT MENU Commercial (2013)
 Merry Christmas from Mr. Plinkett (2013)
 Welcome Back, Star Wars! (2015)
 Ben-Hurt (2016)
 Rich Evans Auditions for Blade Runner 2049 (2017)
 RIP Harry Anderson (2018)
 No One's Ever Really Gone (2019)
 Star Trek Discovery Season 2 In a Nutshell (2019) 
 Dick the Birthday Boy: The Legacy Continues (2022)
 We Finally Watched Nukie: The VHS Grading Video (2022)

Commentary tracksEpisode I – The Phantom Menace (Mike Stoklasa as Mr. Plinkett)Episode IV - A New Hope (Mike Stoklasa as Mr. Plinkett)Star Trek V: The Final Frontier (Mike Stoklasa as Mr. Plinkett)Alien vs. PredatorSamurai CopGhostbusters IIHalloweenAlienThe TerminatorJurassic ParkBatman & RobinA Nightmare on Elm StreetReturn of the JediMasters of the UniverseGremlinsRogue One: A Star Wars StoryThe RoomJustice LeagueRoboCopJingle All the WayArmy of DarknessDungeons & DragonsWeb series
Ongoing

 Half in the Bag (2011–present)
 Best of the Worst (2013–present)
 re:View (2016–present)
 ...Talk About (2018–present)

Defunct

 Produce Isle
 The Grabowskis (2007–2008)
 The Dude Bros (2009)
 Game Station 2.0 (2012)
 Quick Cuts (2013-2014)
 Previously Recorded (2014–2018)
 The Nerd Crew: A Pop Culture Podcast'' (2017–2019)

References

External links
 
 IMDb page
 
 
 
 
 
 
 
 

2004 establishments in Arizona
American comedy web series
American film review websites
American satirical websites
Black comedy
Comedy YouTubers
Companies based in Milwaukee
English-language YouTube channels
Film and television podcasts
Film production companies of the United States
Film review websites
Internet memes
Mass media companies established in 2004
Privately held companies based in Wisconsin
Satirical web series
Viral videos
Web talk shows
Works about Star Trek
Works about Star Wars
YouTube channels launched in 2008
YouTube critics and reviewers
YouTube filmmakers